Mental Floss for the Globe is the debut album by Dutch rap rock band Urban Dance Squad. Released in 1989 (in the US, 1990) and produced by Belgian guitarist Jean-Marie Aerts, the album features a crossover of several music genres, such as rock, hip hop, and funk. It spawned the hit single "Deeper Shade of Soul," which gained the band international recognition, including in the United States, where they toured with Living Colour. The album got to #54 on the Billboard 200 album chart.

"Deeper Shade of Soul" reached #21 on the Billboard Hot 100, and two other singles were taken from the album, "No Kid" and "Fast Lane". The album won an Edison Award in the Netherlands, and in 2008 was named the best Dutch pop album of all time by Dutch music magazine OOR.

Critical reception

The rap metal album was released in the United States to positive reviews; the Toledo Blade commented on the unusual combination of rock instrumentation with a rapper and a DJ, and of hip hop rhythms with heavy metal music, and called it "refreshing".

Track listing

CD release
 "Fast Lane" – 3:29
 "No Kid" – 3:39
 "Deeper Shade of Soul" – 4:32
 "Prayer for My Demo" – 3:40
 "Big Apple" – 3:30
 "Piece of Rock" – 4:59
 "Brainstorm on the U.D.S." – 4:03
 "The Devil" – 3:33
 "Famous When You're Dead" – 5:15
 "Mental Floss for the Globe" – 3:05
 "Struggle for Jive" – 4:04
 "Man on the Corner" – 3:40
 "God Blasts the Queen" – 4:11

Vinyl release
 A1. "Fast Lane"
 A2. "No Kid"
 A3. "Deeper Shade of Soul"
 A4. "Brainstorm on the U.D.S."
 A5. "Big Apple"
 A6. "Piece of Rock"
 B1. "Prayer for My Demo"
 B2. "The Devil"
 B3. "Famous When You're Dead"
 B4. "Mental Floss for the Globe"
 B5. "Struggle for Jive"
 B6. "God Blasts the Queen"

Cassette release

Europe
 A1. "Fast Lane"
 A2. "No Kid"
 A3. "Deeper Shade of Soul"
 A4. "Brainstorm on the U.D.S."
 A5. "Big Apple"
 A6. "Piece of Rock"
 B1. "Prayer for My Demo"
 B2. "The Devil"
 B3. "Famous When You're Dead"
 B4. "Mental Floss for the Globe"
 B5. "Man on the Corner"
 B6. "Hitchhike H.D." - 3:33
 B7. "God Blasts the Queen"

United States
 A1. "Fast Lane"
 A2. "No Kid"
 A3. "Deeper Shade of Soul"
 A4. "Brainstorm on the U.D.S."
 A5. "Big Apple"
 A6. "Piece of Rock"
 B1. "Prayer for My Demo"
 B2. "The Devil"
 B3. "Famous When You're Dead"
 B4. "Mental Floss for the Globe"
 B5. "Struggle for Jive"
 B6. "Man on the Corner"
 B7. "God Blasts the Queen"

The international releases of the album have track length variances due to removal of uncleared samples. For example, "The Devil" originally contained samples from "Orange Claw Hammer", performed by Captain Beefheart, from his 1969 album Trout Mask Replica.

Personnel
Adapted credits from the liner notes of Mental Floss for the Globe.
Urban Dance Squad
 Magic Stick – drums, percussion, backing vocals
 DNA – turntables, special FX, backing vocals
 Rudeboy – leads, backing vocals
 Silly Sil – bass, standing bass, hollow bass, backing vocals
 Tres Manos – guitar, national steel, pedal steel, backing vocals

Additional musicians
 Luther Renaldo Francois – sax ("Deeper Shades of Soul")
 J.M.X. – guitar ("Piece of Rock", "Mental Floss")

Production
 J.M.A. – artistic producer, mixing
 Michel Dierickx – engineer
 Christian Ramon – engineer, mixing
 U.D.S. – mixing

References

External links 
 Mental Floss For The Globe at Discogs

1989 debut albums
Urban Dance Squad albums
Arista Records albums
Funk metal albums